The 1911–12 Austrian First Class season was the first season of top-tier football in Austria. It was won by SK Rapid Wien as they won by a point over Wiener Sportclub.

League standings

Results

References
Austria - List of final tables (RSSSF)

Austrian Football Bundesliga seasons
Austria
1911–12 in Austrian football